Ajaw Bʼot, also known as Ah-Bolon-Abta or Ruler D, was king of the Maya city of Seibal (in present-day Guatemala) during the 8th century.

Biography
Ajaw Bʼot acceded to the throne on January 20, 771, restoring Seibal as an independent capital. It is unknown when he died.

References

External links
"Ajaw Bʼot" on Mesoweb Encyclopedia

Kings of Seibal
8th century in Guatemala